The FIBA U16 European Championship, previously known as the FIBA Europe Championship for Cadets, is a youth basketball competition that was inaugurated with the 1971 edition. Through the 2003 edition, it was held every second year, but since the 2004 edition onward, it is held every year. It serves as the qualification tournament for the FIBA Under-17 World Cup in odd years, for the FIBA Europe region. The current champions are Lithuania.

Division A

Results

Medal table

 Defunct countries in italics.

Participating nations

 As FR Yugoslavia (1992–2001, 3 participations, 3 gold medals) and as Serbia and Montenegro (2003–2006, 4 participations, 2 medals)

MVP Awards (since 1999)

Division B

Results

 Since 2012, the 3rd team in Division B is also promoted to Division A for the next tournament.

Medal table

Participating nations

Division C

Results

Medal table

Participating nations

See also
 FIBA U18 European Championship
 FIBA U20 European Championship

References

External links
 Official website

 
Basketball competitions in Europe between national teams
Europe